You By Me is a series of split albums featuring Tomas Kalnoky, best known as the lead singer of Streetlight Manifesto. The first release, Vol. 1, was released on November 16, 2010, through Kalnoky's Pentimento Music Company, with the second, Vol. 2, released on August 12, 2014.

Vol. 1 - with Dan P.

You By Me: Vol. 1 is a split album featuring Toh Kay (Tomas Kalnoky, of Streetlight Manifesto) and Dan P. (Dan Potthast, of MU330). It was released on November 16, 2010, through Kalnoky's Pentimento Music Company.

The album features Kalnoky covering five songs written by Potthast (four being covers of Potthast's solo work, and one originally by MU330), and Potthast covering five Streetlight Manifesto songs, all written by Kalnoky. Some songs are radically reworked from their original versions, both lyrically and musically.

Track listing

Vol. 2 - with Sycamore Smith

You By Me: Vol. 2 is a split album featuring Toh Kay and Sycamore Smith. It was released on August 12, 2014, by the Pentimento Music Company.

Like its predecessor, the album features Kalnoky covering three songs originally written and performed by Smith and Smith covering three Streetlight Manifesto songs, all written by Kalnoky.

Track listing

See also
 99 Songs of Revolution
 MU330
 Streetlight Manifesto

Tomas Kalnoky albums
2010 albums
2014 albums